is an arcade game released only in Japan by Namco Bandai Games on December 21, 2006.

Introduction
This game, like Brain Age, was supervised by Professor Ryuta Kawashima of Tohoku University. It uses the Rewritable Stage arcade cabinet. The arcade version of The Idolmaster can be converted into this game.

The game has three play modes:
 All-Japan mode, 15 players linked online
 Multiplayer mode, 2~4 players in the same arcade
 One player mode

Player profiles are saved on a rewritable card issued when the users play for the first time.  At this time, they choose an animated assistant who provides onscreen instructions and encouragement.

The game includes 39 games divided into three categories, for the areas of the brain each game is meant to train.

It uses the Rakuhira handwriting recognition system, made by Matsushita Electric Industrial Co.

Games

For Frontal lobe 
 Easy calculation: Answering a number of simple math problems as fast as possible.
 The four basic operations: Given three numbers, the players decide which math operation is used.
 Which way the gears turn: Given a number of gears, players choose the ones which will turn in the same direction. 
(13 games)

For Temporal lobe
 Turning over panels: After viewing a set of symbols, the cards are flipped over, the player is given one symbol, and must find the cards with that same symbol.
 Pair dance: Player must decide which two of a number of dancing figures are in unison.
 Figure puzzle
(13 games)

For Parietal lobe
 Coin exchanging: Changing coins into larger denominations.
 What the major number is: Given a diagram filled with numbers, players identify which number appears the most.
 Touching numbers small to big
(13 games)

Music
The game uses various classical themes as background music:

 The Ruins of Athens Turkish march: Ludwig van Beethoven
 Eine kleine Nachtmusik: Wolfgang Amadeus Mozart
 Orpheus in the Underworld: Jacques Offenbach
 Vivaldi Spring mvt 1 Allegro: Antonio Vivaldi
 Symphony No. 6: Ludwig van Beethoven
 Symphony No. 5: Ludwig van Beethoven
 Variations on "Ah vous dirais-je, Maman": Wolfgang Amadeus Mozart
 Messiah: George Frideric Handel

Extra link
『みんなで鍛える全脳トレーニング』公式サイト (Japanese)

2006 video games
Arcade video games
Arcade-only video games
Brain training video games
Bandai Namco games
Japan-exclusive video games
Video games developed in Japan